William Elvis Sloan I (October 1867 – June 25, 1961) invented the Flushometer flushing mechanism for toilets and urinals. It is installed in millions of commercial, institutional and industrial restrooms worldwide.

Biography
He was born in Liberty, Missouri in October 1867. He was an apprentice pipe fitter in Missouri then moved to Chicago, Illinois. He married Bertha Moore (1874-?) in 1898 in Chicago, Illinois and they had a child, Edith Marie Sloan (1913-?).

In 1906, he founded Sloan Valve Company, which is now headquartered in Franklin Park, Illinois.

He died on June 25, 1961 in Chicago, Illinois and was buried in Oak Park, Illinois.

Legacy
With the exception of a period of time in the 1940s and early 1950s, Sloan Valve has been under the leadership of W.E. Sloan’s descendants. He had a grandson William Elvis Sloan II (1941–2001).

References

1867 births
1961 deaths
American inventors